Donje Paprasko is a village in Bosnia and Herzegovina. It is located in the municipality of Jablanica, Herzegovina-Neretva Canton. The settlement is bordered by the Jablanica lake.  The settlement is a popular summer destination.

Demographics

1879
56 total
Male - 23 (41.07%)
Female - 33 (58.93%)

1971
277 total
Bosniaks - 246 (88.80%)
Serbs - 20 (7.22%)
Yugoslavs - 11 (3.97%)

According to the 2013 census, its population was 209.

References

Populated places in Jablanica, Bosnia and Herzegovina